was a Japanese noble of the early Heian period. He was the fifth son of the sadaijin Fujiwara no Fuyutsugu of the Fujiwara Hokke and the uncle of Emperor Montoku.

Life 

Studying at college in his youth, he possessed a quick tongue. He was steadily promoted in the court. In 842, he also led 40 troops in surrounding Prince Tsunesada in the succession dispute known as the Jōwa Incident. Finally, in 848, he joined the ranks of the kugyō with a promotion to sangi.

In 850, Yoshimi's nephew Crown Prince Michiyasu took the throne as Emperor Montoku. In 857, when his brother Yoshifusa was made daijō-daijin, Yoshimi filled his old rank of udaijin.

In 864 Yoshimi sent his daughter Tamiko as a bride to Emperor Seiwa. Yoshimi's older and more powerful brother Yoshifusa was cautious of his popularity and success. In the Ōtenmon Incident of 866, Yoshimi ordered Minamoto no Makoto's arrest based on the testimony of Tomo no Yoshio, but Yoshifusa protested Makoto's innocence and prevented it. After this, Yoshimi lost most of his political influence.

In 867, Yoshimi suddenly became ill in his chambers, and died that same month. In accordance with his will, he was given a simple burial, his coffin covered with just a single sheet.

Personality and anecdotes 
According to the Nihon Sandai Jitsuroku, Yoshimi was magnanimous and excelled since childhood. A deep believer in Buddhism, his long habit of abstaining from meat and eating simple food meant that all his life he was extremely thin.

The same text records a number of anecdotes about his life, as follow:

Once, when Emperor Ninmyō had boiled some medicine to remove its impurities, he ordered his retainers to taste it to determine its consistencies. Nervous, nobody would try it, but Yoshimi took the cup and drank it all. Ninmyō is said to have praised Yoshimi for respecting his duty to his master.
Yoshimi studied Buddhist writings and was familiar with the Shingon school. When his wife died in Yoshimi's thirties, he immersed himself in prayer to shake off his desires and never remarried.

Legends 

The Konjaku Monogatarishū contains a story in which Yoshimi defends Ono no Takamura who was still a student, when the latter is accused of a crime. Later, Yoshimi dies of sickness and is taken before Enma in Hell. Takamura, now working in Enma's palace as a retainer and assisting in his judgments, intervenes, and Yoshimi is forgiven and returned to life.

Genealogy 

Father: Fujiwara no Fuyutsugu
Mother: , daughter of 
Wife: Daughter of 
Eldest son: 
Son: 
Son: 
Other children:
Son: 
Eldest daughter: , court lady of Emperor Montoku
Daughter: , court lady of Emperor Seiwa
Daughter: wife of 

Although Yoshimi had many children, his eldest son Tokitsura died young after advancing to the rank of dainagon, and none of his other descendants were able to reach the level of kugyō. However, Yoshimi's obituary entry in the Nihon Sandai Jitsuroku does praise the talent and conduct of Tadakata and Naokata, and especially Tadakata's ability with clerical script. Yoshimi's brothers Yoshifusa and Nagara married their daughters to emperors Montoku and Seiwa and were thus able to become the grandfathers of the emperors born of those marriages, but while Yoshimi married off his daughters similarly, neither of them was fortunate enough to bear the emperor any children.

Notes

References 

Fujiwara clan
813 births
867 deaths
People of Heian-period Japan